Rogério "Pará" de Souza Ferreira (born September 13, 1973 in Belém) is a male beach volleyball player from Brazil. He won the gold medal at the 1997 World Championships in Los Angeles, California, partnering Guilherme Marques. Two years later, the couple claimed the bronze medal at the World Championships in Marseille, France.

References
 Rogerio 'Para' Ferreira at the Beach Volleyball Database

1973 births
Living people
Brazilian men's beach volleyball players
Sportspeople from Belém
20th-century Brazilian people